Sikkim United Front Party (SUFP) is a regional political party in the Indian state of Sikkim. Founder and Incumbent President is Narendra Adhikari.

History
On 25 June 2018, Narendra Adhikari established the new political party, Sikkim United Front Party (SUFP) at Ranipool, east Sikkim. In this launching ceremony, Delay Namgyal Barfungpa who is the president of Sikkim National People’s Party (SNPP) also presented.

In March 2019, SUFP participated in the electoral alliance, Sikkim Progressive Alliance (SPA) which was formed by Sikkim Sangram Parishad (SSP), Sikkim Rajya Manch Party (SRMP) and SNPP. SPA sent 8 candidates for Sikkim Legislative Assembly election, 1 candidate for Sikkim Lok Sabah election. As the SPA candidates, SUFP sent 1 candidate to Sikkim Legislative Assembly election, and nominated  Narendra Adhikari to the candidate for Lok Sabha. But in this election, both candidates lost and secured only 0.44% or less votes.

SUFP didn't participate in the Bye-Election of Sikkim Legislative Assembly on 21 October 2019.

Electoral records 
 Sikkim Legislative Assembly election

 Lok Sabha election, Sikkim

References

Political parties in Sikkim
Political parties established in 2018
2018 establishments in Sikkim